Bojophlebia prokopi is an extinct species of winged insect. Originally described as large mayfly-like insect, however this interpretation is denied, and treated as sister group of all other Hydropalaeoptera, infraclass includes groups such as Odonatoptera. Fossil that was described as nymph is later considered as separate taxon, Carbotriplura kukalovae. Original description interpreted structures such as eyes and antennae, however these structures cannot be confirmed after restudy, and that is probably one example of over-interpretations by Kukalová-Peck, same happened with other fossil insects such as Carbotriplura and Gerarus.

References

Prehistoric insect genera